The 1888 Rutgers Queensmen football team represented Rutgers University as an independent during the 1888 college football season. The Queensmen compiled a 1–6–1 record and were outscored their opponents, 341 to 36. The team had no coach, and its captain was Arthur J. Collier.

Schedule

References

Rutgers
Rutgers Scarlet Knights football seasons
Rutgers Queensmen football